glór, formerly glór Irish Music Centre,  is a concert and events venue in Ireland, located in the town of Ennis County Clare. Its capacity allows for 485 people for seated performances. glór also has a studio space for smaller events and artist use, an art gallery, café and bar. 

Since opening in 2001 the venue has become a setting for a wide range of acts including stand-up comedy, drama performances, art exhibitions and a variety of concerts.

glór was designed by Des McMahon of Gilroy McMahon Architects. The challenge was to create a building which would allow the user to experience Irish music in an intimate and real way, whether in a small group or as a member of a large audience.

Awards
It was nominated for the Munster category of the IMRO Live Music Venue of the Year Award in 2008 and won that award in 2012.

References

External links
Official Site
Photograph of the Theatre

Buildings and structures in Ennis
Music venues in the Republic of Ireland
Tourist attractions in County Clare